Wu Chih-chung is a Taiwanese politician. He has been the Deputy Minister of Foreign Affairs in the Executive Yuan since 20 May 2016, and has later become the Diplomatic Representative from Taiwan in France since 16 July 2018.

Educational background 

He has studied in Paris, France from 1989 to 1998 and has obtained his master's degree in diplomacy and his doctoral degree in political science from the Pantheon-Sorbonne University. After returning to Taiwan, he has worked as a professor at Soochow University in the Department of Political Science. His areas of expertise are geopolitics, diplomatic history, EU foreign policy, post-war world situation, French government and French politics.

Professional experience 

Due to his experience and expertise of international relations and European affairs, he has been recruited by several public or private institutions for advisory positions, such as  Taipei and Taichung City Government, Ministry of Foreign Affairs and Ministry of Education, etc. 

As the president and later the honorary president of Alliance Française in Taiwan, he has been relentlessly promoting the exchange between Taiwan and France. In 2014, he was appointed by the French President François Hollande as a Knight of the French National Order of Merit.

References

Living people
1965 births
Academic staff of Soochow University (Taiwan)
Knights of the Ordre national du Mérite
Taiwanese Ministers of Foreign Affairs